Andreas Trajkovski Sørensen (born 18 March 1993 in Copenhagen) is a Danish long jumper.

His father, Christian Trajkovski, is from Macedonian origin and had been Danish national champion of 100 m and 200 m.
His son won one title at European Team Championships with he shares the national record of the 4 x 100 m Relay. In long jump, his personal best is 7.83m which he did in 2021 at the Danish National Championships. Back in 2012 he jumped 7.82	m (-0.4), National Junior record at Estadio Olímpico, Barcelona (2012).
He has established a new national record on 4 x 100 m with Frederick Schou-Nielsen, Tazana Kamanga-Dyrbak and Kojo Musah, with 39.61, in Meeting de Paris, 24 August 2019.

He competed for Iowa Western Reivers and Arkansas Razorbacks.

References

External links
IAAF Athlete’s profile

1993 births
Danish male long jumpers
Living people
Iowa Western Reivers athletes
Arkansas Razorbacks men's track and field athletes
21st-century Danish people